Nikolai Alekhin (1913–1964) was a Soviet Union rocket designer. The lunar crater Alekhin is named in his honour.

1913 births
1964 deaths
Soviet engineers
20th-century Russian engineers
Rocket scientists